The 2014 USAFL National Championships was the 18th installment of the premier United States annual Australian rules football club tournament. The tournament was held in Dublin, Ohio from the 11–12 October. The National Champions from the men's competition were the New York Magpies and from the women's competition the champions were the Denver Bulldogs.

Grand final

Men's National Club Rankings

See also

References

http://usafl.com/nationals/2014/schedule?type=All&Team=&&page=1

External links

USAFL National Championships
Australian rules football competitions
National championships in the United States
Sports competitions in Ohio
Sports in Dublin, Ohio
USAFL National Championships
USAFL National Championships